Gargaz-e Tazeh Yal (also Romanized as Gargaz-e Tāzeh Yal and Garkaz-e Tāzeh Yal) is a village in Jeyransu Rural District, in the Central District of Maneh and Samalqan County, North Khorasan Province, Iran. At the 2006 census, its population was 551, in 112 families.

References 

Populated places in Maneh and Samalqan County